General David Rubakuba Muhoozi is a Ugandan Military Officer and Lawyer. He currently serves as the Minister of State for Internal Affairs. He was appointed to that position on 6 June 2021, replacing Obiga Kania.

Background and education
David Muhoozi was born in Mbarara District in 1965. Muhoozi holds the degree of Bachelor of Laws (LLB), obtained from Makerere University, Uganda's largest and oldest public university. He also obtained the Diploma in Legal Practice, from the Law Development Center, in Kampala, Uganda. His degree of Master of Arts in International Affairs was obtained from an institution yet to be revealed.

Military training
He attended the Uganda Military Academy, back when it was still located in  Jinja, for his Officer Cadet course. He then attended the Company Commander course at Monduli, Tanzania in 1998. He followed that with the Senior Command and Staff College course in Ghana. Following that, he was admitted to the Royal College of Defence Studies.

Over the years, he has also attended the following military courses:
(1) A Professional Security Course in Israel (2) An Executive Course for Senior African Military Leaders in Beijing, China (3) An Internal Crisis Management Course in Ghana (4) An International Peace Support Operations (IPSO) Course at Kofi Annan International Peace Keeping Training Centre in Ghana (5) A Defense Management Course in Ghana and (6) A Senior International Defense Course at the Naval Postgraduate School, California, United States of America, California, USA.

Military career
He joined the army in 1985 and was commissioned on April 21, 1989. He then served as Defense Counsel for the General Court Martial. In 1997, he was assigned to the Chieftaincy of Military Intelligence (CMI), as Staff Officer General Duties, serving in that role for the next four years.

Over the years, he has served in these positions within the UPDF:
(1) Base Commander, Entebbe Air Force Base (2) Chief Of Staff, UPDF Air Force (3) Commander of Air Defense Division - Nakasongola Air Force Base (4) Commander of the Armored Brigade - Masaka and (5) Brigade Commander, Motorized Infantry Brigade - Nakasongola Chief of Defence Forces 2017 -2021

 UPDF
 Crispus Kiyonga
 Katumba Wamala
 Wilson Mbadi
 Muhoozi Kainerugaba
 Samuel Turyagyenda

References

External links
Brigadier David Muhoozi Promoted

Makerere University alumni
People from Mbarara District
Living people
Graduates of the Royal Military Academy Sandhurst
Ugandan military personnel
Law Development Centre alumni
Uganda Military Academy alumni
1965 births
Ugandan generals